Baker's Hawk is a 1976 American Western film directed by Lyman D. Dayton and starring Clint Walker, Burl Ives, Diane Baker, Lee H. Montgomery and Alan Young. It is based on the 1974 novel of the same name by Jack Bickham.

Plot summary
During the summer of 1876, 12 year old Billy Baker finds an injured baby hawk and subsequently befriends an old hermit in hopes that he can heal the injured bird. Because the old man shares his remote mountain homestead with various sick or injured animals in need of attention, many of the townspeople have labelled him as "crazy". When the townspeople start assuming that he and certain other newcomers are a threat to the safety of the community, they begin an effort to oust these tramps.

In an attempt to prevent the vigilantes from getting out of control, Billy's father, Dan Baker, is persuaded by the local sheriff to volunteer as a temporary unpaid deputy, and Billy makes some important discoveries about prejudice, responsibility, courage and friendship.

Cast
Clint Walker as Dan Baker
Burl Ives as Mr. McGraw
Diane Baker as Jenny Baker
Lee H. Montgomery as Billy Baker
Alan Young as Mr. Paul Carson
Bruce M. Fischer as Blacksmith
Cam Clarke as Morrie Carson
Danny Bonaduce as Robertson

Production and release
Baker's Hawk began four weeks of location shooting in the mountains of Provo, Utah on July 19, 1976 and production continued in Burbank, California.

The film was released in 300 movie theaters across the United States and Canada on December 22, 1976.

References

External links
 

 

1976 films
1976 Western (genre) films
American Western (genre) films
Films based on American novels
Films set in the 1870s
Films set in 1876
Films about friendship
Films about birds
Films shot in Utah
1976 directorial debut films
1970s English-language films
1970s American films